The 1996 Utah State Aggies football team represented Utah State University in the 1996 NCAA Division I-A football season. The Aggies were led by head coach John L. Smith in his second year in charge. The Aggies played their home games at Romney Stadium in Logan, Utah. Utah State finished with a 6–5 record and a share of the Big West conference championship, but was not selected to a bowl game.

Previous season
Utah State finished the 1995 season with a record of 4–7, a one-win improvement over the prior year. The Aggies were led by prolific sophomore running back Abu Wilson on offense, and junior linebacker David Gill on defense. Both Wilson and Gill returned for the 1996 season. Coach John L. Smith also retained the majority of his coaching staff, including offensive coordinator Bobby Petrino, and defensive coordinator Chris Smeland.

At the end of the 1995 season, the Big West Conference once again underwent significant realignment as follows:

- UNLV and San Jose State left to join the Western Athletic Conference. 
- Northern Illinois, Arkansas State, Louisiana, and Louisiana Tech left for independence. 
- Pacific dropped its football program, citing financial concerns. 
- North Texas joined from independence. 
- Boise State and Idaho joined from the Big Sky Conference of Division I-AA.

Schedule

Roster

Season summary
Utah State opened the season with back-to-back victories for the first time since the 1978 season as they defeated bitter rivals Utah and Division I-AA Cal State Northridge in a pair of home games. The victory over Utah was the first since 1987 when the Aggies had upset the Utes in Salt Lake City.

After an encouraging set of wins, the Aggies faced four difficult games in four weeks. They would fall in competitive road games to Southern Mississippi and Oklahoma State, before suffering less competitive losses on the road to Texas Tech and then at home to #21 BYU. The home game against BYU set the record for the largest crowd ever at Romney Stadium, with 33,119 spectators in attendance.

Moving into Big West play, the Aggies won each of their first four conference games by an average margin of 18 points. Having reached bowl eligibility, the Aggies hosted the Nevada Wolf Pack for a chance to win an outright Big West conference championship and secure a bowl berth. However, Nevada would win the game in Logan comfortably, beating the Aggies 54–27. The 1996 contest between the two teams constituted Nevada's fifth consecutive victory, a streak that would end the following year in Reno as the teams again played for a conference championship.

On offense, the Aggies built on the previous season's success under coordinator Bobby Petrino and incorporated a few new names alongside returning rushing leader Abu Wilson. Matt Sauk, a junior college transfer from Orange Coast College, stepped into a competitive quarterback room that included previous year starter Patrick Mullins. By the end of the season, Sauk had become the starter and threw for over 2,400 yards (including three 300+ passing yard performances). The 1996 season marks the most passing yards per game ever for an Aggie team (317.5). The top target for Sauk and Mullins in 1996 was Nakia Jenkins, who hauled in 82 receptions for 1,397 yards and 8 touchdowns.

Abu Wilson once again led the Aggies rushing attack, accumulating 840 yards and 16 touchdowns (a school record at the time). Wilson finished his career with 40 total rushing touchdowns, which remains a school record shared with Robert Turbin.  Joining Wilson in the backfield was freshman Demario Brown, who would add 700 yards and 8 touchdowns. Brown would eventually become the leading rusher in Utah State history, and shares the record for most rushing attempts with Wilson. After the season, Abu Wilson was named to the Blue-Gray All-Star Game as acknowledgement for his record-setting career. Both Wilson and Brown were named to the All-Big West Conference team. 

Defensively, the Aggies were led once again by senior linebacker David Gill. For the third consecutive year, Gill led the team in tackles (150 total, 16 shy of his 1995 mark). Gill would finish his Aggie career second all-time in tackles behind Del Lyles (1988-91), and still holds two of the top five spots for tackles in a season (1995 and 1996). He has since been surpassed by Bobby Wagner for all-time tackles, who finished tied with Lyles at 446. Other leaders for the Aggie defense in 1996 included Dwayne Nelson, Danilo Robinson, Ben Crosland, Spencer Waggoner, and Mike Hudson.

Awards and honors
The Aggies had 16 players named to either the first or second all-conference team in the Big West.

References

Utah State
Utah State Aggies football seasons
Big West Conference football champion seasons
Utah State Aggies football